Sardar Muhammad Bakhsh Khan Mahar is a Pakistani politician who is member of the National Assembly of Pakistan.

Political career
Bakhsh Khan Mahar contested by-election on 23 July 2019 from constituency NA-205 (Ghotki-II) of National Assembly of Pakistan on the ticket of Pakistan People's Party Parliamentarian. He won the election by the majority of 18,511 votes over the independent runner up Ahmed Ali Khan Mahar. He garnered 89,359 votes while Ahmed Khan Mahar received 70,848 votes.

References

Living people
Pakistan People's Party MNAs
Pakistani MNAs 2018–2023
Year of birth missing (living people)